Ottmar Scheuch (born 29 November 1954) is a retired German football forward.

References

External links
 

1954 births
Living people
German footballers
Bundesliga players
SpVgg Au/Iller players
VfL Bochum players
Place of birth missing (living people)
Association football forwards